Singapore Premier League Awards Night is a football awards ceremony held by the Football Association of Singapore since the S.League's inaugural season in 1996.

Awards

Player of the Year Award
Note nationality of players at presentation of award. A number of foreign players were naturalised to play for Singapore later in their career.

Young Player of the Year

* Fahrudin Mustafić held Serbian citizenship before being naturalised to play for Singapore in 2007.

Top Scorers

* Mirko Grabovac was a naturalised Singapore player from 2002 until he renounced his Singapore citizenship in 2008.
^ Goals in all domestic competitions, including the S.League and Singapore Cup.

Source:

Coach of the Year

Fair Play Award

Special awards

100 S.League goals

Aleksandar Đurić became a naturalised Singapore player in 2007.

200 S.League goals

Mirko Grabovac was a Singaporean when he won the 200 S.League Goals award in 2005.

300 S.League goals

Defunct Award Categories

Manager of the Year

People's Choice Award

References

External links
 https://web.archive.org/web/20150414073112/http://kallangroar.com/stats-forum/1330-s-league-awards.html#post41932
 http://www.sleague.com/Web/Main.aspx?ID=,68e68380-9e0b-44b2-8a32-d06df7470ca6&NLT=300&AID=69a6fcac-6887-4725-839e-e2516529f7ae
 http://s-leaguefootball.blogspot.com/2010/11/s-league-awards-night-2010.html
 http://www.sleague.com/Web/Main.aspx?ID=,68e68380-9e0b-44b2-8a32-d06df7470ca6&NLT=300&AID=9a6b8cb7-970d-4dc9-b57c-9ad42472811a
 http://www.sleague.com/Web/Main.aspx?ID=,68e68380-9e0b-44b2-8a32-d06df7470ca6&NLT=300&AID=9a6b8cb7-970d-4dc9-b57c-9ad42472811a

Football in Singapore